Afro-Uruguayans are Uruguayans of predominantly African descent. The majority of Afro-Uruguayans are in Montevideo.

History
For most of the colonial period, the port of Buenos Aires (see Afro-Argentines) served as the exclusive entry point for enslaved Africans in the Río de la Plata region. Slaves entering the port of Buenos Aires were then regularly shipped inland to Córdoba and the northwestern provinces of Salta and Tucumán in Argentina, across the Andes Mountains to Chile (see Afro-Chileans) and to the mines of Potosí in Alto Perú (see Afro-Bolivians).

The term “Afro-Uruguayans” is problematic in itself, the phrase diminishes relations of these individuals in black communities and is much too specific because of mixed cultures. To strengthen the connections between black communities back in the 1800s, “Orientals” is more fitting in regards to modern-day Uruguay, rather than “Afro-Uruguayans” because of lands history and origin.

The region of Uruguay has a complex history of militias and military action. Colonial militia service went hand in hand with slave enrollment during wars of independence. These militias, specifically the colonial Black militias centered in the Rio de la Plata had opened themselves to the idea of taking in slaves to strengthen their military, meaning both free and enslaved men of African descent fought together in battles after 1810. The gain of slaves allowed the addition of people, mixing races, ideals and class levels. Black recruits within the militia had mixed thoughts on the military, some soldiers seeing the military as a burden versus black officers seeing potential in the militias. The new recruits taken in, in the form of slaves provided more soldiers that would be fighting for Uruguay on foot. The slaves involved in these militias, also called “citizen-soldiers” were able to defend their rights and gain some freedom through their service. This new form of freedom allowed enslaved and free men alike to create black communities, where soldiers would create identities and be one with society. Slave ships bringing over soldiers brewed collected identities to interact with one another and create social networks. These networks allowed Africans and their descendants to push against domination within the Spanish Regime. All men strong enough and of African descent were impacted by the military regardless to if they were already in a battalion or an emerging battalion. Men of color who were free were sometime forced to serve along white men before 1841 Even with the pressure of the military some Africans willingly joined militias before slavery was abolished.

Black communities in these Militias allowed Africans to feel a sense of belonging and helping them ease into colonial societies such as the Republic of Uruguay.  Up till 1830, black soldiers were responsible for the establishment and creation of the first professional Uruguayan infantry, only to be followed by all African men of ancestry being added into the army of Guerra Grande  from 1839 to 1852 and freed. With the freedom of slaves, unlike before, where black soldiers were commanded by white officers, now, anyone from black battalions could participate in military networks. Black militia officers gained legal privileges and contributed in national politics because of the ban on slavery. Along with the anti slavery laws set in Uruguay, any newly arrived slaves would be freed and be reintroduced as “African colonist”. As new recruits of black soldiers flowed in, the freed individuals were able to connect more with commanders and people in units and create social strategies in these new formations.  The building of Uruguay and its success hinges mainly on its military, the black militias and their actions based on African-born population In the second half of the 18th Century after the abolishment of slavery, a war in the Río de la Plata deployed free black militias. These militias were spread from Paraguay to Montevideo African troops were ordered to march beside the Spanish to fight the Guaraní missions on the Uruguay River. Over this mass of land, the Militia service hosted opportunities for isolated black populations to make contact and create bonds with the militias. These interactions allowed more men to join and prolong the development of these  associations. African influence in the military was vast, and the militias took in these traditions to celebrate and honor African culture.

The Day of Kings was a celebration portrayed by Africans and was heavily influenced by the Catholic religion and how it was mixed with African ideals. African traditions were incorporated into the Military uniforms and flag of Uruguay in order to capture the sense of community and the value of culture. This furthered the sense of belonging in these militias, where African battalions could highlight their military role in the founding of the nation.

Candombe

Recent immigration trends
At the beginning of the 21st century there are some Nigerians, Cameroonians, Senegalese and other African immigrants. Additionally, in the border region in the north of the country with Brazil Afro-Brazilians have become an increasingly large part of the population.

Afro-feminism
There is an Afro-Uruguayan trend within the feminist movement.

Notable Afro-Uruguayans

Historical
 Joaquín Lenzina, freed slave and poet

Politics

Activism
 Adelia Silva (1925-2004), educator and poet, who had a significant role in improving civil rights for Afro-Uruguayans
 Sandra Chagas, dancer and activist

Government
 Edgardo Ortuño, minister to industry, energy and mining of Uruguay.
 Alba Roballo, politician
 Gloria Rodríguez Santo, politician

Arts

Poetry
 Virginia Brindis de Salas, poet

Cabaret
 Tina Ferreira, journalist and vedette
 Rosa Luna, dancer and vedette

Music
 Alvaro Salas, candombe percussionist
 Rubén Rada, candombe singer
 Cayetano Alberto Silva, musician

Sports

Track & Field
 Déborah Rodríguez, Olympic hurdelist and fashion model

Football
 Alexis Rolín
 David Terans
 Diego Arismendi
Gonzalo Carneiro
 José Leandro Andrade, football player
 Egidio Arévalo Ríos,  football player
 Felipe Carvalho
 Carlos Diogo
 Víctor Diogo, football player
 Santiago García, football player
 Ángel Rodríguez, football player
 Abel Hernández, football player
 Richard Morales, football player
 Nicolás Olivera, football player
 Rubén Olivera, football player
 Álvaro Pereira, football player
 Mario Regueiro, football player
 Víctor Rodríguez Andrade, football player
 Diego Rolán, football player
 Carlos Sánchez, football player
 Darío Silva, football player
 Obdulio Varela, football player
 Marcelo Zalayeta, football player
 Nicolás de la Cruz, football player
 Luis Suárez, football player
 Ronald Araújo

References

External links

 
Uruguayan
Ethnic groups in Uruguay